Alma Selimovic (born 1981) is a queer artist and LGBT*IQA human rights defender. She was one of the organizers of the first Queer Sarajevo Festival and is known for her mixed media art works which explore questions of body, gender and sexuality. Selimovic has exhibited her work in over 30 museums, galleries and other venues in Bosnia and Herzegovina, Germany and the United States. As of 2017, she lives and works in the US. Selimovic identifies as a lesbian and gender-queer person.

Early years and education 
Selimovic was born in Rijeka in Croatia in 1981, but grew up in Sarajevo, Bosnia and Herzegovina. When the war broke out in Bosnia and Herzegovina, Selimovic was 11 years old. During wartime, she was a dancer and dancing gave her strength to cope with living in besieged Sarajevo. She was raised by her grandparents and often watched her grandfather carve figurines out of wood to keep her entertained. She graduated in 2009 from the Academy of Fine Arts in Sarajevo and in 2015 she completed her MFA studies at the Pennsylvania Academy of the Fine Arts in Philadelphia.

Career

Human rights work 
Selimovic was a member of Organization Q, which was the first organization advocating to promote and protect the culture, identities, and human rights of queer persons in Bosnia and Herzegovina. The group organized the first Queer Sarajevo Festival in 2008 and faced a violent backlash. Selimovic's work Metal was being exhibited when the festival was attacked during its opening. Due to the death threats the organizers received and the physical attacks on the festival participants, Selimovic left for the US in 2009 where she was granted political asylum. Nine years later, in July 2017, Selimovic had an exhibition in Sarajevo, in which she presented eighteen fiber-glass works of gender non-conforming and trans* persons from Croatia, Serbia, Montenegro and Bosnia and Herzegovina. Also in 2017, she curated an exhibition Body language in Washington DC consisting of paintings, photographs and video installations by seven queer artists and activists from Bosnia and Herzegovina, Croatia and Serbia.

Artwork 
Selimovic's art uses different media including fiberglass, plaster, metal, foam and hair. Her art explores the spaces between the non-binary gender language and individual expression of sex and gender. In her metal works she portrays androgynous figures. Winter Mendelsen describes her work:
Selimovic's source of inspiration comes from her own background as said in her artist statement:

Awards and recognition 
In 2015, Selimovic received the Fine Arts Venture Fund Award by Pennsylvania Academy of the Fine Arts. In 2014, she received the Justine Cretella Memorial Scholarships for the Outstanding Achievement by the Pennsylvania Academy of the Fine Arts. In 2013 and 2014, she received a Merit Award and Scholarship from the Pennsylvania Academy of the Fine Arts.

References

External links 

1981 births
Living people
Date of birth missing (living people)
Artists from Rijeka
21st-century Bosnia and Herzegovina artists
Bosnia and Herzegovina women artists
Bosnia and Herzegovina women activists
Pennsylvania Academy of the Fine Arts alumni
Queer artists
Bosnia and Herzegovina human rights activists
Bosnia and Herzegovina expatriates in the United States
Mixed-media artists
Bosnia and Herzegovina LGBT people
Bosniaks of Croatia
21st-century LGBT people